Husband and Wife may refer to:

Marriage, a legal or ritual union between individuals, usually but not always between a husband and wife
Husband and Wife (operetta), a 1910 Azerbaijani operetta by Uzeyir Hajibeyov
Husband and Wife (1916 film), a silent film with Holbrook Blinn and Ethel Clayton
Husband and Wife (1952 film), an Italian comedy film
Husband and Wife (1953 film), a Japanese film directed by Mikio Naruse
Conjoined trees or "husband and wife" trees, see inosculation
Fuqi feipian, a dish in Sichuan cuisine

See also
Husbands and Wives (disambiguation)